Ancona is a small town in Victoria, Australia named after Ancona in Italy.

Settled late, a Post Office (briefly named Ancorna) was not opened until 15 September 1905 (closed 1968).
It is located on Ancona Road, in a valley in the Shire of Mansfield local government area.

References

Towns in Victoria (Australia)
Shire of Mansfield